Megachile melanderi is a species of bee in the family Megachilidae. It was described by Mitchell in 1944.

References

Melanderi
Insects described in 1944